KTouch is a software application to learn and practice touch typing. It comes with courses for many different keyboard layouts across dozens of languages. KTouch utilizes a system to track the user's progress. If the user completes a lesson successfully, the following lesson will become available.

Features 
KTouch is user customizable. The user can select a goal, which allows them to advance to the next lesson when met. It also allows users to add new layouts and languages, and change the lessons with the built-in editor. There is also a statistics page which contains a histogram of the user's typing speed. The statistics page also keeps track of how well the user does on individual keys so they know which keys they need to practice.

Although KTouch was designed for the KDE SC, it still works in other desktop environments (DE) such as GNOME.

 Ships with dozens of courses spanning many different languages and keyboard layouts
 Powerful course and keyboard layout editor for user-created training material
 Comprehensive training statistics to track and analyze your learning progress

References

External links 

 Project home page

KDE software
Typing software
KDE Education Project
Free educational software
Software that uses Qt
Touch typing tutors for Linux